There are two St Patrick's Cathedrals in Armagh, Northern Ireland:

St Patrick's Cathedral, Armagh (Church of Ireland), the Anglican cathedral (and the Catholic cathedral prior to the Protestant Reformation)
 St Patrick's Cathedral, Armagh (Roman Catholic), built after the Reformation